Didier Guillon is a French-Swiss entrepreneur, cosmetics expert, artist, art collector, curator and philanthropist.  
 
He is the Chairman and Art Director of the Valmont Group since 1990. He is inspired by artists and creations selected and sponsored by Fondation Valmont.

Sharing his vision of aesthetics, Didier dedicates his passion for art to sublimate by creating very limited editions of refined packaging to welcome exceptional formulas.

The marriage of art and beauty became the main claim of the brand: When Art meets Beauty.Early life and career
Guillon was born on March 28, 1953 in Neuilly-sur-Seine, France. He is the descendant of an international art collector, Charles Sedelmeyer and also the great-great son of French sculptor and art historian Stanislas Lami and descendant of the sculptor and Egyptologist Alphonse Lami. His father, Claude Guillon, was the co-founder of Laboratoires Expanscience.

Didier studied at the Panthéon Assas University in Paris where he graduated with a Business Law degree in 1979.

Perpetuating a family tradition, Didier Guillon is a noted art collector. In reaction against the profusion of furniture, artworks, sculptures and paintings accumulated at home, he found himself closed to the American minimalism of mid 20th century represented by Sol LeWitt, Frank Stella and Donald Judd.

Literally the “love at first sight” is what drives Didier Guillon in his choices: together with the American minimalism, his preferences embrace a long list of international artists among which:
Frederic Amat, Joan Gardy Artigas, Isao Llorens Ishikawa Artigas, Jane Le Besque, Leonardo Cimolin, Quentin Garel, Yves Lévêque, Christian Renonciat, Silvano Rubino and Sophie Westerlind.

Personal lifeDidier Guillon and Sophie Vann Guillon have led Valmont Group for more than 30 years, working together to shape the identity and development of the brand. Mentors, ambassadors, pygmalions, initiators and managers... they dialogue, debate and create, all in a spirit of mutual esteem, purposefully pursuing a shared passion.

FONDATION VALMONT: A FATHER AND HIS SON
In 2015, Didier Guillon gives birth to Fondation Valmont an institution hosting his collection and dedicated to the promotion of contemporary art by supporting young artists.

In 2018, Palazzo Bonvicini became the main headquarter of Fondation Valmont
The exhibitions held in this typical 16th century Venetian palace contribute significantly to the Venetian art scene by presenting every year collective projects. Didier Guillon shares his passion for art... from one generation to the next... there's only one mask! The roots of art, the ultimate ambition. Maxence joins Didier Guillon in his discoveries and creations.

Maxence, 23 years old, started his career as a volunteer. After an experience in Asia, then another in Africa, he continued his studies in the footsteps of his father in the legal field.

From gallery to museum, Maxence makes his father's passion his own. Father and son share their emotions around art. When Maxence discovers the German artist A.R. Penk, Didier joins him in his choices, and follows his son's wise advice by buying Robert Combas. The two Guillon complement each other perfectly.
As of January 2022, Didier Guillon once again expresses his freedom and independence by appointing his son Maxence, to take over Fondation Valmont... while Didier will permanently move to Venice, to celebrate art in all its forms. Art and passion for universal beauty...
This appointment nourishes the passion that drives Maxence today. His professional career, combined with multiples trips as well as his international experience, allow him to accept the challenge by stepping into the Valmont group.

DIDIER GUILLON : An artist

As a non-traditional curator, and a cultural agitator, Didier Guillon often holds exhibitions where he invites artists to think about a thematic and explore new fields of creation.

He likes to express his visions and ideas with metaphors: the mask, the gorilla and the cage are reminiscent throughout his works. With his icons''' he likes to raise questions on our world and its current challenges, points out issues and searches for ways to enchant reality. True to his nature, he exhilarates as he relentlessly works to fine-tune his ideas. Over the last years, he designed multiple works in various media, several dimensions, skillfully combining a wide array of materials. He likes to think of new ways to approach, discuss and appreciate contemporary art.

Exhibitions
2013
Le Jardin Suspendu – Verbier – Switzerland
MagicEvent: Benedicte Blanc Fontenille- Montréal – Canada
Plats d’Artistes – Hydra – Greece
55th Venice's Biennale – Glasstress – Venice – Italy

2014 
Collection d’Artistes – Hôtel Le Meurice – Paris – France
Collection d’Artistes – New-York – United States of America
Plats d’Artistes – Hong-Kong

2015
The Dialogue of Fire – 56th Venice's Biennale – Venice – Italy
Collection d’Artistes – Barcelona – Spain
Collection d’Artistes – Tokyo – Japan

2016
El Cuor No Se Vende – Hydra – Greece
Collection d’Artistes – La Maison Valmont, Berlin, Germany
The Room of Dreams, Judi Harvest – Barcelona, Spain
Yves Bélorgey – Kempinski Hotel – Geneva, Switzerland
Quentin Garel – Spa By Valmont – Verbier, Switzerland

2017
Iliodora Margellos – La Maison Valmont, Geneva, Switzerland
Beauty and the Beast – in the context of the 57th Biennale of Venice, Italy
El Bocho – in La Maison Valmont, Berlin, Germany

2018 
Elective Affinities – Nyon's castle, Nyon, Switzerland

2019
The Elegant Symmetry of the Gorilla : Geneva, Munich, Hong Kong 
Hansel & Gretel – White Traces in Search of Your Self : Venice, Palazzo Bonvicini
White Mirror : Tokyo - New York - Milan - Chengdu

2020
Venetian Love : Venice, Palazzo Bonvicini
Les Résidences Valmont : When Art & Beauty meet Hospitality
Tinstwalo African Colors : Berlin, Munich, Milano
Scarface, Parfum d’artiste

2021
Janus : Venice, Hydra

References

Living people
1953 births